Alberta Senior Hockey League (ASHL) may refer to:

Alberta Senior Hockey League (1936–1941)
Alberta Senior Hockey League (1965–1978)

See also
Alberta Junior Hockey League
Alberta Midget Hockey League